Hopi Junior Senior High School (HJSHS) is a tribal junior high and high school in Keams Canyon, Arizona. It is operated in cooperation with the Bureau of Indian Education (BIE) as a grant day school.

Administration
 Superintendent – Steven Berbeco, Ed.D.
 High School Principal – Lynn Fredericks
 Junior High Principal – Alban Naha
 Special Education Director – Pete Butler (Acting)
 Dean of Students – Jerry Cronin

Governing Board
 President – Valerie Kooyaquaptewa
 Vice-President – Laurel Polyestewa
 Secretary – Sandra Dennis
 Anita Bahnimptewa
 Melvin Pooyouma
 Jack Harding

Academics
Hopi Junior Senior High School is accredited by Cognia, formerly known as the North Central Association of Colleges and Schools.

Sports accomplishments

The Hopi Bruins' boys' and girls' teams are a prominent activity at the school. Running is deeply rooted in the northern Arizona tribe's tradition as a way to carry messages and bless the reservation with rain. The boys currently have a total of 27 straight state championships, which is the national record according to the National Federation of State High School Associations, while the girls currently have 22 state titles.

Boys' Cross Country (27 state champions) (national record)'''
 1990. 1991, 1992, 1993, 1994, 1995,   1996, 1997, 1998, 1999, 2000, 2001,    2002, 2003, 2004, 2005, 2006, 2007,   2008, 2009, 2010, 2011, 2012, 2013,  2014, 2015, 2016

Girls' Cross Country (22 State Champions)
 1987, 1988, 1989, 1990, 1991, 1992,   1993, 1994, 1996, 1997, 1998, 1999,   2000, 2002, 2003, 2007, 2008, 2009,   2010, 2011, 2012, 2013

History

The school's 1987 opening gave the Hopi community its first reservation high school and allowed for the closure of the Phoenix Indian School. For most of its history, it has been the only high school in Keams Canyon.

For a time in the late 1990s and 2000s, the school was a public charter, though it changed back to a BIE school in 2005.

In November 2013, Charles Youvella, a running back and defensive back for Hopi's football team, incurred a head injury during a Division V playoff game against the team from Arizona Lutheran Academy; he lined up for two more plays, then collapsed on the field.  He was in critical condition by the time he reached St. Joseph's Hospital and Medical Center in Phoenix and died two days later.

Footnotes

References

External links
 https://web.archive.org/web/20131125191418/http://www.aiaonline.org/story/uploads/Cross_Country___Boys_Championship_Teams_1352224701.pdf
 https://web.archive.org/web/20131125195836/http://www.aiaonline.org/story/uploads/Cross_Country___Girls_Championship_Teams_1352225611.pdf
 http://www.nfhs.org/

Public high schools in Arizona
Educational institutions established in 1987
Public middle schools in Arizona
Hopi Reservation
Schools in Navajo County, Arizona
Bureau of Indian Education schools in Arizona
1987 establishments in Arizona
Native American schools in Arizona